Slitu is a village in the municipality of Eidsberg, Norway. Its population (2005) is 543, of which seven people live within the border of the neighboring municipality of Trøgstad.

Villages in Østfold